Become the Hunter is the sixth studio album by American deathcore band Suicide Silence. The album was released on February 14, 2020 through Nuclear Blast. Two years after its release, drummer Alex Lopez would depart from the band. Lopez is erroneously credited for drums on the album, but drums were actually performed by touring drummer Ernie Iniguez.

Musical style
After the overwhelmingly negative fan reaction to the nu metal direction heard on the band's self-titled album, Become the Hunter features a return to the deathcore sound the band is known for. Additionally, Dom Lawson of Blabbermouth.net noted sludge metal influences on "Two Steps" and "In Hiding".

Reception

Become the Hunter received positive reviews from critics and has been hailed as the band's "return to form".

Blabbermouth.net's Dom Lawson called the album "the perfect follow-up to You Can't Stop Me", while Naomi Sanders of Distorted Sound called Become the Hunter "a massive step up from the last album."

A more mixed review come from Joe Smith-Engelhardt of Exclaim!, who stated "the new record isn't a perfect show from them, but it is a return to form." Smith-Engelhardt said the album feels like a logical follow up to You Can't Stop Me and praised the band's use of guitar solos on the album, saying "instead of shoehorning in a solo for every song, they sparingly bring them in and have a great structure to each one." He said "Skin Tight" was the weakest song on the album, citing its atmospheric instrumental section and vocal delivery, comparing those moments to Suicide Silence. The review concluded by saying "if you can pretend their last album never happened, it's a fantastic collection of songs and any fan of the genre will be able to find some things they like, but ultimately, it does feel like their switchback was done to save their career."

Track listing

Personnel
Suicide Silence
Eddie Hermida – vocals
Mark Heylmun – guitars
Chris Garza – guitars
Dan Kenny – bass

Additional musicians
Ernie Iniguez – drums
Clinton Bradley – programming, sound design
Darius Tehrani – additional vocals on track 11

Production
Steve Evetts – production
Josh Wilbur – mixing
Ted Jansen – mastering
Adrian Baxter – artwork, layout
Rob Kimura – layout design

References

Suicide Silence albums
2020 albums
Nuclear Blast albums
Albums produced by Steve Evetts